The 1995 Canadian Junior Curling Championships were held February 4-12 at the Caledonian Curling Club in Regina, Saskatchewan.

For the women's event, prior to 1994, the winner of the Canadian Junior Curling Championships would go on to play in the following season's World Junior Curling Championships. However, the Canadian Curling Association (CCA) made a rule change where the winner of the Canadian Junior Curling Championships would advance to Worlds in the same season. As a result, Jennifer Jones did not get the opportunity to play in the 1995 World Junior Curling Championships after her victory in the 1994 Canadian Junior Curling Championships because of the rule change. Instead, Jones' 1994 championship team was given a berth as top seed directly into the semifinals, where she lost to former teammate Kelly MacKenzie.

Men's

Teams

Standings

Results

Draw 1

Draw 2

Draw 3

Draw 4

Draw 5

Draw 6

Draw 7

Draw 8

Draw 9

Draw 10

Draw 11

Draw 12

Draw 13

Draw 14

Draw 15

Draw 16

Draw 17

Playoffs

Semifinal

Final

Women's

Teams

Standings

Results

Draw 1

Draw 2

Draw 3

Draw 4

Draw 5

Draw 6

Draw 7

Draw 8

Draw 9

Draw 10

Draw 11

Draw 12

Draw 13

Draw 14

Draw 15

Draw 16

Draw 17

Playoffs

Semifinals

Final

External links
Men's statistics
Women's statistics

References

Canadian Junior Curling Championships
Curling in Saskatchewan
Sports competitions in Regina, Saskatchewan
Canadian Junior Curling Championships
1995 in Saskatchewan
February 1995 sports events in North America